Iván Gabriel Cañete Martínez (born 22 April 1995, in Paraguay) is a Paraguayan footballer.

Career
At the age of 12, Cañete moved to Spain, where he played for the youth academy of Rayo Vallecano.

For 2016, he returned to Paraguay to join Cerro Porteño after failing to make an appearance for Atlético Madrid, one of Spain's most successful clubs. However, he soon suffered an injury there.

For 2019, Cañete signed for Madureira Esporte Clube in Brazil.

For 2020, he signed for the Bolivian side Club Atlético Palmaflor.

References

External links
Iván Cañete at playmakerstats.com (English version of ceroacero.es)

Paraguayan footballers
Paraguay international footballers
Association football defenders
Cerro Porteño players
Madureira Esporte Clube players
C.D. Palmaflor del Trópico players
People from Luque
1995 births
Living people